The 1987 Colgate Red Raiders football team was an American football team that represented Colgate University during the 1987 NCAA Division I-AA football season. Colgate finished third in the Colonial League.

In its 12th and final season under head coach Frederick Dunlap, the team compiled a 7–4 record. Kenny Gamble and Kyle Warwick were the team captains. 

Despite posting a winning record, the Red Raiders finished exactly even on the scoresheet, scoring 236 points and allowing 236 points over the course of the season. Colgate's 2–2 conference record placed third in the six-team Colonial League standings.

The Red Raiders spent two weeks in the national top 20 rankings, reaching No. 13 in the poll released September 22 and No. 11 on September 29, but then fell out of the rankings and were not ranked at season's end.

The team played its home games at Andy Kerr Stadium in Hamilton, New York.

Schedule

References

Colgate
Colgate Raiders football seasons
Colgate Red Raiders football